Roger (–2018) was an Australian red kangaroo best known for his muscular physique.

Life
Roger was rescued as a joey by Chris 'Brolga' Barns after Roger's mother was killed by a car. Barns stated following the announcement of Roger's death that "Roger was the sanctuary's alpha male for many years". In videos Roger can be seen chasing Barns, who, like all other males, Roger saw as a threat to his harem.

Roger first came to fame in 2015 in a video that went viral, showing a bucket he was said to have crushed. In 2016, Barns announced that Roger was suffering from arthritis.

Death and reaction
Barns announced Roger's death on 8 December 2018. Roger, also known as "Ripped Roger" and the "Jacked Kangaroo", was 12. Upon hearing of Roger's death, Australian singer Natalie Imbruglia said "He always brought a smile to my face. Such a proud strong boy", and Tourism Australia called him a "true icon". The cause of death was reported as "old age".

References

Individual animals in Australia
2006 animal births
2018 animal deaths
Macropods